Venonia is a genus of spiders in the family Lycosidae. It was first described in 1894 by Thorell. , it contains 16 species.

Species
Venonia comprises the following species:
Venonia chaiwooi Yoo & Framenau, 2006
Venonia choiae Yoo & Framenau, 2006
Venonia cinctipes (Simon, 1898)
Venonia coruscans Thorell, 1894
Venonia infundibulum Yoo & Framenau, 2006
Venonia joejim Yoo & Framenau, 2006
Venonia kimjoopili Yoo & Framenau, 2006
Venonia kokoda Lehtinen & Hippa, 1979
Venonia micans (Simon, 1898)
Venonia micarioides (L. Koch, 1877)
Venonia milla Lehtinen & Hippa, 1979
Venonia muju (Chrysanthus, 1967)
Venonia nata Yoo & Framenau, 2006
Venonia spirocysta Chai, 1991
Venonia sungahae Yoo & Framenau, 2006
Venonia vilkkii Lehtinen & Hippa, 1979

References

Lycosidae
Araneomorphae genera
Spiders of Asia
Spiders of Australia